BRP Sindangan (MRRV-4407) is the sixth ship of the Parola-class patrol vessels of the Philippine Coast Guard.

Design and features
The Philippine Coast Guard clarified that the ship is a law enforcement vessel and is designed to conduct environmental and humanitarian missions, as well as maritime security operations and patrol missions.

The ship was designed with a bulletproof navigation bridge, and is equipped with fire monitors, night vision capability, a work boat, and radio direction finder capability.

The ship will be equipped with communications and radio monitoring equipment from Rohde & Schwarz, specifically the M3SR Series 4400 and Series 4100 software-defined communication radios, and DDF205 radio monitoring equipment. These equipment enhances the ship's reconnaissance, pursuit and communications capabilities.

Construction, delivery and commissioning

Service history 
Divers from the BRP Sindangan also assessed the hull of the BRP Gregorio del Pilar, which was eventually pulled out from the shoal a couple of days later.

Gallery

References

External links 

Parola-class patrol boats
2017 ships
Ships built by Japan Marine United